An agency debit memo (ADM) is a notice sent, normally by an airline to a travel agent, requiring the recipient to pay a sum of money to the sender. A frequent reason for issue of an ADM is where an air travel ticket has been issued and its rules have not been fully complied with, such as where the fare rules require tickets to be issued within three days of creating the PNR or reservation, and the ticket was issued on the fifth day.

Other reasons can include: 

- Holding a seat on a flight, even after the airline has cancelled your space, and not removing it before the aircraft departs.

- "Origin and Destination abuse": i.e. On a flight from Sydney to London that goes through Dubai, holding in space in the lowest fare class from Sydney to Dubai, and holding in space in the lowest fare class from Dubai to London, instead of looking at the available fare levels for the entire single journey length.

- Booking additional sectors within an already ticketed PNR (especially the case with British Airways).

- Booking a separate, short, unrelated flight at the end of a large itinerary, causing the GDS to price the fare with a notably lower fuel surcharge.....

- Rebooking and ticket reissue not completed at the same time, or within a set time frame.

 

 Airline tickets